Prinzhorn is a surname. Notable people with the name include:

Hans Prinzhorn (1886–1933), German psychiatrist and art historian
Thomas Prinzhorn (born 1943), Austrian industrialist and politician

See also 
Prinzhorn Dance School, English rock music group
Prinzhorn Dance School (album), is debut album by British alternative rock band Prinzhorn Dance School.